Six ships of the British Royal Navy have been named HMS Boyne after the Battle of the Boyne, 1690.

  was an 80-gun second rate. This ship of the line was launched in 1692, rebuilt in 1739 and broken up in 1763. When under the command of Captain Dursley she helped take Gibraltar in 1704.
  was a 70-gun third rate launched in 1766 and broken up in 1783.
  was a 98-gun second rate launched in 1790. She was the flagship of Vice Admiral John Jervis in 1794. She caught fire and burnt at Spithead on 1 May 1795.
  was a 98-gun second rate launched in 1810 and commanded first by Thomas Hastings and later Henry Chads. She was renamed  in 1834 and Queen Charlotte in 1859. Her career ended in 1861.
  was a  launched in 1904 and broken up in 1919
  was a Mersey-class trawler launched in 1918 and sold in 1946.

References

Royal Navy ship names